Events from the year 1934 in Sweden

Incumbents
 Monarch – Gustaf V
 Prime Minister – Per Albin Hansson

Events

 Dissolution of Välgörande fruntimmerssällskapet.

Popular culture

Theatre 
 Gothenburg City Theatre opened

Sports 
 16–18 February – The men's World Figure Skating Championships took place in Stockholm
 20–25 February – FIS Nordic World Ski Championships 1934 in Sollefteå
 3–4 August – The 1934 World Archery Championships were held in Båstad

Births

 21 May – Bengt I. Samuelsson, Swedish biochemist, recipient of the Nobel Prize in Physiology or Medicine
 28 May – Torsten Engberg, military officer (died 2018)
 16 June – Evy Berggren, gymnast.
 22 June – Ragnar Svensson, Greco-Roman wrestler from Sweden
 5 July – Erik Uddebom, athlete
 9 November – Ingvar Carlsson, politician
 21 November – Carl-Henning Wijkmark, writer. 
 22 November – Östen Warnerbring, singer and composer (died 2006)
 24 November – Sven-Bertil Taube, actor and singer (died 2022)

Exact date missing 
 Sven Erlander, mathematician

Deaths
 17 September – Erik Lindqvist, sailor (born 1886).
 5 November –  Carl Charlier, astronomer (born 1862)

References

 
Sweden
Years of the 20th century in Sweden